Hammarby is a locality situated in Sandviken Municipality, Gävleborg County, Sweden with 552 inhabitants in 2010.

References 

Populated places in Sandviken Municipality
Gästrikland